Achievements may refer to:

Achievement (heraldry)
Achievement (horse), a racehorse
Achievement (video games), a meta-goal defined outside of a game's parameters

See also
 Achievement test for student assessment
 Achiever, a personality type
 Need for achievement